The Apprentice is an Italian reality television series, in which a group of aspiring young businessmen and women compete for the chance to win a job as "apprentice" to Flavio Briatore, a business magnate.

First edition
Winner
Francesco Menegazzo, 29, Trader 
Other Contestants
Alberto Belloni, 37, Businessman
Beatrice Orlando, 33, College researcher
Chiara Gallana, 24, Public relations attendant
Davide Gaiardelli, 34, Businessman
Donatello Bellomo, 33, Marketing advisor
Enrico Perone, 25, Advertiser
Enrico Tarantino, 27, Software developer
Jessica Cibin, 26, Modeling agency manager
Marcella Gamba, 39, Insurance agency manager
Maria Elena Caruso, 29, Cosmetics agency CEO
Martina Frappi, 25, Businessman and fashion designer
Matteo Gatti, 38, Commercial consultant
Norma Bossi, 27, Press office manager
Silvia Fazzini, 24, Foreign languages student
Stefano Di Dio, 36, Business advisor

Donatello and Norma haven't passed the last selection, so they are not part of the official cast.

 The candidate was on the winning team
 The candidate was on the losing team
 The candidate won as project manager
 The candidate lost as project manager
 The candidate was brought back to the boardroom
 The candidate was fired
 The candidate lost as project manager and was fired
 The candidate quit the competition
 The candidate won as project manager but was fired

Second edition
Winner
Alice Maffezzoli, 29 anni, Sales manager in the energy sector
Other Contestants
Anais Rean, 24, International sciences student
Anna Zhitnikova, 28, Finance accounter in the lux sector
Eleonora Smith, 24, Business administration student
Fabio Cascione, 34, Commercial director in the wine sector
Francesco Del Pesce, 31, Corporate lawyer
Fulvio Cugno, 30, Web marketing businessman
Ingrid Altomare, 34, Advertising & digital account director
Marco Martinelli, 22, Biotechnology student
Mario Crea, 34, Real estate manager
Milena Pagani, 34, Sales manager in the amusement parks
Muhannad Al Salhi, 25, Telecommunications sales manager
Serena Marzucchi, 34, Public sector lawyer
Simone Piadena, 42, Nightlife businessman

 The candidate was on the winning team
 The candidate was on the losing team
 The candidate won as project manager
 The candidate lost as project manager
 The candidate was brought back to the boardroom
 The candidate was fired
 The candidate lost as project manager and was fired
 The candidate was on the winning team, but was fired

References

External links
 Official site

Italian reality television series
Italy
2012 Italian television series debuts
2012 Italian television series endings
2010s Italian television series
Sky Uno original programming
Cielo (TV channel) original programming